Gérard Rasquin (30 July 1927 – 11 December 2012) was a Luxembourgian sprinter. He competed in the 400 metres at the 1952 Summer Olympics and the 1956 Summer Olympics.

References

1927 births
2012 deaths
Athletes (track and field) at the 1952 Summer Olympics
Athletes (track and field) at the 1956 Summer Olympics
Luxembourgian male sprinters
Luxembourgian male middle-distance runners
Olympic athletes of Luxembourg
Place of birth missing